Myrmecia picta is an Australian ant which belongs to the genus Myrmecia. It is native to Australia. Myrmecia picta is distributed throughout all of Australia.

The length of Myrmecia picta is around 13.5-14.5 millimetres long. Most of the body is in a black colour, mandibles are yellow; antennae and anterior legs are a reddish yellow. Colour of nodes range in colour, being brown or a reddish colour.

References

External links

Myrmeciinae
Hymenoptera of Australia
Insects described in 1858
Insects of Australia